Geroski is a surname. Notable people with the surname include:

Branko Geroski (born 1962), Macedonian journalist and chief editor
Paul Geroski (1952–2005), UK economist

See also
Geroskipou, a coastal village east of Paphos, Cyprus